PC Records is a German Neo-Nazi music label. The label is an artistic outlet for the Chemnitz Neo-Nazi scene and one of the most active of the far-right and "Rock Against Communism" music scene in Germany. PC Records is releasing some of the most regionally popular Neo-Nazi bands. Several of the albums released by the label have been indexed for Neo-Fascist content. The label includes a shop and a mailorder business. The name "PC" refers to the phrase "Political Correctness, no thanks!"

According to the Office for the Protection of the Constitution (Landesamt für Verfassungsschutz Sachsen), PC Records "has a high reputation in the right-wing extremist scene at home and abroad. Its turnover is estimated at several hundred thousand euros per year. The profits enable business owners not only to make a living, but also to finance and promote scene activities."

Connections and Glorification of NSU Terrorist
Founder of PC Records, Hendrik Lasch, had good connections to National Socialist Underground (NSU) member Uwe Mundlos in the 1990s. Lasch promoted a T-shirt, made to raise money to support the three Neo-Nazi activists of NSU, who hid from the police.

The album Adolf Hitler Lives by Gigi & Die Braunen Stadtmusikanten was released on PC Records in 2010. The CD features the song "Döner-Killer". In the song, Daniel Giese praises the series of murders committed by the NSU, which were later uncovered.

Bands
Featuring around 200 far-right rock album releases from 2000 to 2014, PC Records is one of the most active right-wing labels in Germany. With numerous solo samplers, the label finances activities of the neo-fascist scene and its protagonists. The label released music from the following bands:

 Aryan Brotherhood
 Arische Jugend
 Act of Violence
 Blitzkrieg|Blitzkrieg, Chemnitz
 Brutal Attack, UK
 Die Lunikoff Verschwörung (follow-up project of the forbidden Berlin band „Landser“)
 Division Germania, Mönchengladbach 
 Gigi & Die Braunen Stadtmusikanten, Daniel Giese 
 Heilige Jugend
 Kodex Frei
 Sacha Korn 
 Sleipnir
 Stahlgewitter
 Sturmwehr
 Skalinger
 Ungebetene Gäste

References

Anti-communist organizations
German nationalist organizations
Neo-Nazi record labels
Neo-Nazism in Germany